The 1997 UCLA Bruins baseball team represented the University of California, Los Angeles in the 1997 NCAA Division I baseball season. The Bruins played their home games at Jackie Robinson Stadium. The team was coached by Gary Adams in his 23rd year at UCLA.

The Bruins won the Midwest Regional to advance to the College World Series, where they were eliminated after losses to the Miami (FL) Hurricanes and Mississippi State Bulldogs.

Roster

Schedule 

! style="" | Regular Season
|- valign="top" 

|- align="center" bgcolor="#ccffcc"
| 1 || January 23 || at  || Rainbow Stadium • Honolulu, Hawaii || 23–11 || 1–0 || 0–0
|- align="center" bgcolor="#ccffcc"
| 2 || January 24 || at Hawaii || Rainbow Stadium • Honolulu, Hawaii || 10–0 || 2–0 || 0–0
|- align="center" bgcolor="#ccffcc"
| 3 || January 25 || at Hawaii || Rainbow Stadium • Honolulu, Hawaii || 12–8 || 3–0 || 0–0
|- align="center" bgcolor="#ccffcc"
| 4 || January 28 || at  || Earl Wilson Stadium • Paradise, Nevada || 7–4 || 4–0 || 0–0
|-

|- align="center" bgcolor="#ccffcc"
| 5 || February 1 || at UNLV || Earl Wilson Stadium • Paradise, Nevada || 12–5 || 5–0 || 0–0
|- align="center" bgcolor="#ccffcc"
| 6 || February 2 || at UNLV || Earl Wilson Stadium • Paradise, Nevada || 10–3 || 6–0 || 0–0
|- align="center" bgcolor="#ccffcc"
| 7 || February 4 ||  || Jackie Robinson Stadium • Los Angeles, California || 6–5 || 7–0 || 0–0
|- align="center" bgcolor="#bbbbbb"
| 8 || February 5 || at  || Matador Field • Northridge, California || 9–9 || 7–0–1 || 0–0
|- align="center" bgcolor="#ccffcc"
| 9 || February 7 ||  || Jackie Robinson Stadium • Los Angeles, California || 11–3 || 8–0–1 || 0–0
|- align="center" bgcolor="#ffcccc"
| 10 || February 8 || Nevada || Jackie Robinson Stadium • Los Angeles, California || 5–6 || 8–1–1 || 0–0
|- align="center" bgcolor="#ccffcc"
| 11 || February 9 || Nevada || Jackie Robinson Stadium • Los Angeles, California || 11–0 || 9–1–1 || 0–0
|- align="center" bgcolor="#ccffcc"
| 12 || February 11 || at  || John Cunningham Stadium • San Diego, California || 7–1 || 10–1–1 || 0–0
|- align="center" bgcolor="#ccffcc"
| 13 || February 14 ||  || Jackie Robinson Stadium • Los Angeles, California || 13–1 || 11–1–1 || 0–0
|- align="center" bgcolor="#ccffcc"
| 14 || February 15 || at Loyola Marymount || George C. Page Stadium • Los Angeles, California || 10–5 || 12–1–1 || 0–0
|- align="center" bgcolor="#ccffcc"
| 15 || February 16 || Loyola Marymount || Jackie Robinson Stadium • Los Angeles, California || 13–4 || 13–1–1 || 0–0
|- align="center" bgcolor="#ccffcc"
| 16 || February 18 || at  || Caesar Uyesaka Stadium • Santa Barbara, California || 17–7 || 14–1–1 || 0–0
|- align="center" bgcolor="#ccffcc"
| 17 || February 21 ||  || Jackie Robinson Stadium • Los Angeles, California || 4–3 || 15–1–1 || 1–0
|- align="center" bgcolor="#ccffcc"
| 18 || February 22 || Arizona State || Jackie Robinson Stadium • Los Angeles, California || 16–5 || 16–1–1 || 2–0
|- align="center" bgcolor="#ffcccc"
| 19 || February 23 || Arizona State || Jackie Robinson Stadium • Los Angeles, California || 12–17 || 16–2–1 || 2–1
|- align="center" bgcolor="#ccffcc"
| 20 || February 25 ||  || Jackie Robinson Stadium • Los Angeles, California || 21–10 || 17–2–1 || 2–1
|- align="center" bgcolor="#ccffcc"
| 21 || February 28 || vs  || Hubert H. Humphrey Metrodome • Minneapolis, Minnesota || 11–5 || 18–2–1 || 2–1
|-

|- align="center" bgcolor="#ccffcc"
| 22 || March 1 || vs  || Hubert H. Humphrey Metrodome • Minneapolis, Minnesota || 12–9 || 19–2–1 || 2–1
|- align="center" bgcolor="#ccffcc"
| 23 || March 2 || at  || Hubert H. Humphrey Metrodome • Minneapolis, Minnesota || 13–5 || 20–2–1 || 2–1
|- align="center" bgcolor="#ffcccc"
| 24 || March 4 || UC Santa Barbara || Jackie Robinson Stadium • Los Angeles, California || 6–9 || 20–3–1 || 2–1
|- align="center" bgcolor="#ffcccc"
| 25 || March 7 || at  || Jerry Kindall Field at Frank Sancet Stadium • Tucson, Arizona || 2–4 || 20–4–1 || 2–2
|- align="center" bgcolor="#ffcccc"
| 26 || March 8 || at Arizona || Jerry Kindall Field at Frank Sancet Stadium • Tucson, Arizona || 3–13 || 20–5–1 || 2–3
|- align="center" bgcolor="#ccffcc"
| 27 || March 9 || at Arizona || Jerry Kindall Field at Frank Sancet Stadium • Tucson, Arizona || 12–1 || 21–5–1 || 3–3
|- align="center" bgcolor="#ccffcc"
| 28 || March 11 ||  || Jackie Robinson Stadium • Los Angeles, California || 7–6 || 22–5–1 || 3–3
|- align="center" bgcolor="#ccffcc"
| 29 || March 13 ||  || Jackie Robinson Stadium • Los Angeles, California || 16–2 || 23–5–1 || 3–3
|- align="center" bgcolor="#ccffcc"
| 30 || March 22 || at  || Dedeaux Field • Los Angeles, California || 12–6 || 24–5–1 || 4–3
|- align="center" bgcolor="#ccffcc"
| 31 || March 23 || USC || Jackie Robinson Stadium • Los Angeles, California || 8–5 || 25–5–1 || 5–3
|- align="center" bgcolor="#ffcccc"
| 32 || March 24 || at USC || Dedeaux Field • Los Angeles, California || 7–8 || 25–6–1 || 5–4
|- align="center" bgcolor="#ccffcc"
| 33 || March 27 ||  || Jackie Robinson Stadium • Los Angeles, California || 13–1 || 26–6–1 || 6–4
|- align="center" bgcolor="#ccffcc"
| 34 || March 28 || California || Jackie Robinson Stadium • Los Angeles, California || 9–0 || 27–6–1 || 7–4
|- align="center" bgcolor="#ccffcc"
| 35 || March 29 || California || Jackie Robinson Stadium • Los Angeles, California || 8–0 || 28–6–1 || 8–4
|-

|- align="center" bgcolor="#ffcccc"
| 36 || April 1 || at Pepperdine || Eddy D. Field Stadium • Malibu, California || 7–8 || 28–7–1 || 8–4
|- align="center" bgcolor="#ccffcc"
| 37 || April 4 || at Arizona State || Packard Stadium • Tempe, Arizona || 5–2 || 29–7–1 || 9–4
|- align="center" bgcolor="#ffcccc"
| 38 || April 5 || at Arizona State || Packard Stadium • Tempe, Arizona || 3–4 || 29–8–1 || 9–5
|- align="center" bgcolor="#ffcccc"
| 39 || April 6 || at Arizona State || Packard Stadium • Tempe, Arizona || 14–15 || 29–9–1 || 9–6
|- align="center" bgcolor="#ffcccc"
| 40 || April 8 ||  || Jackie Robinson Stadium • Los Angeles, California || 3–14 || 29–10–1 || 9–6
|- align="center" bgcolor="#ccffcc"
| 41 || April 11 || Arizona || Jackie Robinson Stadium • Los Angeles, California || 11–3 || 30–10–1 || 10–6
|- align="center" bgcolor="#ccffcc"
| 42 || April 12 || Arizona || Jackie Robinson Stadium • Los Angeles, California || 13–6 || 31–10–1 || 11–6
|- align="center" bgcolor="#ccffcc"
| 43 || April 13 || Arizona || Jackie Robinson Stadium • Los Angeles, California || 13–3 || 32–10–1 || 12–6
|- align="center" bgcolor="#ffcccc"
| 44 || April 19 || at Stanford || Sunken Diamond • Stanford, California || 4–7 || 32–11–1 || 12–7
|- align="center" bgcolor="#ccffcc"
| 45 || April 19 || at Stanford || Sunken Diamond • Stanford, California || 8–5 || 33–11–1 || 13–7
|- align="center" bgcolor="#ccffcc"
| 46 || April 20 || at Stanford || Sunken Diamond • Stanford, California || 5–3 || 34–11–1 || 14–7
|- align="center" bgcolor="#ccffcc"
| 47 || April 22 || San Diego || Jackie Robinson Stadium • Los Angeles, California || 8–3 || 35–11–1 || 14–7
|- align="center" bgcolor="#ffcccc"
| 48 || April 25 || USC || Jackie Robinson Stadium • Los Angeles, California || 6–10 || 35–12–1 || 14–8
|- align="center" bgcolor="#ffcccc"
| 49 || April 26 || at USC || Jackie Robinson Stadium • Los Angeles, California || 2–11 || 35–13–1 || 14–9
|- align="center" bgcolor="#ccffcc"
| 50 || April 27 || USC || Jackie Robinson Stadium • Los Angeles, California || 14–4 || 36–13–1 || 15–9
|- align="center" bgcolor="#ffcccc"
| 51 || April 29 || at Cal State Fullerton || Goodwin Field • Fullerton, California || 3–11 || 36–14–1 || 15–9
|-

|- align="center" bgcolor="#ccffcc"
| 52 || May 2 || at California || Evans Diamond • Berkeley, California || 6–5 || 37–14–1 || 16–9
|- align="center" bgcolor="#ccffcc"
| 53 || May 3 || at California || Evans Diamond • Berkeley, California || 7–6 || 38–14–1 || 17–9
|- align="center" bgcolor="#ffcccc"
| 54 || May 4 || at California || Evans Diamond • Berkeley, California || 8–9 || 38–15–1 || 17–10
|- align="center" bgcolor="#ffcccc"
| 55 || May 6 || at Long Beach State || Blair Field • Long Beach, California || 3–7 || 38–16–1 || 17–10
|- align="center" bgcolor="#ccffcc"
| 56 || May 9 || Stanford || Jackie Robinson Stadium • Los Angeles, California || 10–9 || 39–16–1 || 18–10
|- align="center" bgcolor="#ccffcc"
| 57 || May 10 || Stanford || Jackie Robinson Stadium • Los Angeles, California || 13–8 || 40–16–1 || 19–10
|- align="center" bgcolor="#ffcccc"
| 58 || May 11 || Stanford || Jackie Robinson Stadium • Los Angeles, California || 6–9 || 40–17–1 || 19–11
|- align="center" bgcolor="#ffcccc"
| 59 || May 13 || Cal State Northridge || Jackie Robinson Stadium • Los Angeles, California || 6–12 || 40–18–1 || 19–11
|-

|-
! style="" | Postseason
|- valign="top"

|- align="center" bgcolor="#ffcccc"
| 60 || May 22 || vs  || Allie P. Reynolds Stadium • Stillwater, Oklahoma || 2–7 || 40–19–1 || 19–11
|- align="center" bgcolor="#ccffcc"
| 61 || May 23 || vs  || Allie P. Reynolds Stadium • Stillwater, Oklahoma || 15–14 || 41–19–1 || 19–11
|- align="center" bgcolor="#ccffcc"
| 62 || May 24 || vs  || Allie P. Reynolds Stadium • Stillwater, Oklahoma || 5–3 || 42–19–1 || 19–11
|- align="center" bgcolor="#ccffcc"
| 63 || May 24 || vs Harvard || Allie P. Reynolds Stadium • Stillwater, Oklahoma || 14–9 || 43–19–1 || 19–11
|- align="center" bgcolor="#ccffcc"
| 64 || May 25 || at  || Allie P. Reynolds Stadium • Stillwater, Oklahoma || 14–2 || 44–19–1 || 19–11
|- align="center" bgcolor="#ccffcc"
| 65 || May 25 || at Oklahoma State || Allie P. Reynolds Stadium • Stillwater, Oklahoma || 22–2 || 45–19–1 || 19–11
|-

|- align="center" bgcolor="#ffcccc"
| 66 || May 31 || vs Miami (FL) || Johnny Rosenblatt Stadium • Omaha, Nebraska || 3–7 || 45–20–1 || 19–11
|- align="center" bgcolor="#ffcccc"
| 67 || June 1 || vs  || Johnny Rosenblatt Stadium • Omaha, Nebraska || 5–7 || 45–21–1 || 19–11
|-

</ref>

Awards and honors 
Eric Byrnes
 All-Pac-10

Troy Glaus
 All-Pac-10
 All-Midwest Regional Team
 First Team All-American Baseball America
 First Team All-American The Sports Network
 First Team All-American National Collegiate Baseball Writers Association
 Second Team All-American Collegiate Baseball

Jon Heinrichs
 All-Pac-10
 Second Team All-American Collegiate Baseball
 Second Team All-American American Baseball Coaches Association
 Third Team All-American Baseball America
 Third Team All-American National Collegiate Baseball Writers Association

Tom Jacquez
 All-Pac-10

Jim Parque
 All-Pac-10
 All-Midwest Regional Team
 Third Team All-American Collegiate Baseball
 Second Team All-American The Sports Network
 Second Team All-American American Baseball Coaches Association

Nick Theodorou
 All-Midwest Regional Team

Eric Valent
 All-Pac-10
 All-Midwest Regional Team
 Second Team All-American The Sports Network
 Third Team All-American American Baseball Coaches Association

Peter Zamora
 All-Pac-10
 All-Midwest Regional Team
 Third Team All-American National Collegiate Baseball Writers Association

References 

UCLA Bruins baseball seasons
College World Series seasons
UCLA Bruins
UCLA
UCLA